Jean Alexandre Loubignac (23 November 1901 - 4 March 1991) was a French film director. A specialist of popular comedies, Jean Loubignac is well known for the film Ah! Les belles bacchantes which he directed in 1955, written and performed by Robert Dhéry and Francis Blanche.

Filmography 
Director

 1938 : Sommes-nous défendus ?
 1948 : Le voleur se porte bien
 1948 : Le Barbier de Séville
 1949 : Piège à hommes
 1949 : The Martyr of Bougival 
 1950 : Piédalu voyage
 1950 : Le Gang des tractions-arrière
 1951 : Piédalu à Paris
 1952 : Foyer perdu
 1952 : Piédalu fait des miracles
 1954 : Piédalu député
 1954 : Ah! Les belles bacchantes
 1956 : Coup dur chez les mous

Film editor
 1938 : La France est un empire by Emmanuel Bourcier
 1941 : Le Valet maître by Paul Mesnier

References

External links 
 
 19 films liés à  Jean Loubignac sur CinéRessources.net

French film directors
People from Neuilly-sur-Seine
1901 births
1991 deaths